The Women's U21 European Volleyball Championship is a sport competition for volleyball national teams with players under 21 years, currently held biannually and organized by the European Volleyball Confederation, the volleyball federation from Europe. As of the 2024 edition, the CEV will align the age limit for the men's and women's competitions to U22.

Results summary

Medal summary

Participating nations

References

External links

Competition History

 
Womens U21
Volleyball